The Q Tour is a series of snooker tournaments, immediately below the level of the World Snooker Main Tour.

The tour originally ran between the 1994–95 season and the 2004–05 season as professional non-ranking events. Due to the large numbers of players on tour at that time the new WPBSA Minor Tour was formed so players lower down the rankings had tournaments to play in. It was subsequently rebranded the UK Tour and then the Challenge Tour. It was revived for the 2018–19 season, before being rebranded as the Q Tour for the 2021–22 season.

History 
The concept of a secondary professional tour was first experimented with in the 1994–95 season in the form of the WPBSA Minor Tour to provide competition for lower ranked professionals, but only ran for a season. Due to over-subscription of the World Snooker Tour, a two-tiered tour structure was adopted from the 1997–98 season resulting in the Main Tour and the UK Tour. The Main Tour had an exclusive membership, whereas initially the whole professional membership could compete on the UK Tour and the best performers could earn promotion. From the 1999–2000 season, entry was limited to players not competing on the Main Tour, and from the 2001–02 season the UK Tour itself had an exclusive membership. From the 2000–01 season it was rebranded the Challenge Tour.

In its first season there were five events, but the number was reduced to four in the following seasons. There were two official maximum breaks at the UK Tour, both in the 1998–99 season; the first was made by Stuart Bingham against Barry Hawkins in Event 3, and the second by Nick Dyson against Adrian Gunnell in Event 4. The tour was discontinued after 2004–05 season.

The Pro Challenge Series was introduced for the 2009–10 season, all tour players being eligible to play. Only four of the planned seven events were played before the series was axed due to low player participation. The following season, 2010–11, saw the Pro Challenge Series replaced by the Players Tour Championship, a secondary tour comprising tournaments carrying ranking points, but at a much lower tariff than the major televised tournaments.

The Challenge Tour was revived in the 2018–19 season, consisting of ten events each played over one or two days, with prize money offered and a maximum field of 72 players (top 64 of the Q School Order of Merit, plus eight wildcards). The top two players from the Challenge Tour Order of Merit received a tour card for the following season. From the 2020–21 season, the Challenge Tour was rebranded as the Q Tour.

Event finals

Order of Merit winners

References

 
Snooker amateur competitions
Snooker non-ranking competitions
Snooker tours and series
Snooker competitions in the United Kingdom
Recurring sporting events established in 1994
1994 establishments in the United Kingdom
Recurring sporting events disestablished in 2005
2005 disestablishments in the United Kingdom
Recurring sporting events established in 2018
2018 establishments in the United Kingdom